The 2022 Scotland Tri-Nation Series was the 15th round of the 2019–2023 ICC Cricket World Cup League 2 cricket tournament that took place in Scotland in August 2022. It was a tri-nation series between Scotland, the United Arab Emirates and the United States cricket teams, with the matches played as One Day International (ODI) fixtures. The ICC Cricket World Cup League 2 forms part of the qualification pathway to the 2023 Cricket World Cup. In June 2022, Cricket Scotland confirmed the fixtures for the series.

Squads

Fixtures

1st ODI

2nd ODI

3rd ODI

4th ODI

5th ODI

6th ODI

References

External links
 Series home at ESPN Cricinfo

2022 in Emirati cricket
2022 in Scottish cricket
International cricket competitions in 2022
Scotland
Scotland Tri-Nation Series